Hancock High School can refer to:

 Hancock High School (Chicago, Illinois)
 Hancock High School (Kiln, Mississippi)
 Hancock High School (St. Louis, Missouri)
 Hancock High School (Sneedville, Tennessee)
 Hancock Central High School (Sparta, Georgia)
 Hancock Central High School (Hancock, Michigan)